Ünal Alpuğan (born 3 August 1973) is a Turkish-German former professional footballer who played as a midfielder.

Honours
 DFB-Pokal: 2000–01

References

External links
 

1973 births
Living people
German people of Turkish descent
Sportspeople from Gelsenkirchen
Turkish footballers
German footballers
Footballers from North Rhine-Westphalia
Association football midfielders
FC Schalke 04 players
Çaykur Rizespor footballers
İstanbul Başakşehir F.K. players
Bundesliga players
Süper Lig players
German expatriate footballers
German expatriate sportspeople in Turkey
Expatriate footballers in Turkey